The Zola River, also known as the Zola Chai is a river in Iran, flowing into Lake Urmia. It runs north of Urmia and west of Salmas. Rising in the mountains along the border with Turkey, it flows southwest along the Salmas Plain. The river has a catchment area of 846 km².

Zola Reservoir 
The river has also been dammed for irrigation. The dam has a height of 83m and a width of 287m and is constructed of an Earth-rock dam with central clay core. The dam holds 85 million m³ of water.

Ecology 
The Zola river is an important component of the ecosystem of the Lake Urmia Basin. Lake Urmia is drying out and has taken on a red color due to phytoplankton in recent years. The health of this river is a key indicator of the health of the whole basin and is therefore the subject of much study.

References

Rivers of Iran
Assyrian geography
Landforms of East Azerbaijan Province
Landforms of West Azerbaijan Province